Xiao Guodong (born 10 February 1989) is a Chinese professional snooker player. He turned professional in 2007 after winning the Asian Under-21 Championships.

Career

2007–2010
Xiao appeared as a wildcard in the 2007 China Open, and beat the then world number 50 Tom Ford 5–3, before losing 0–5 to Matthew Stevens.

In his first ranking tournament, the 2007 Grand Prix he finished 4th in his qualifying group by winning 3 out his 7 matches. In the 2007 Northern Ireland Trophy he beat Leo Fernandez 5-1 and Jimmy White 5–0, before he lost to David Gilbert 2–5.

He lost his first match in the 2007 UK Championship to Kurt Maflin and to the same player in the 2008 China Open qualifiers too. In the Welsh Open he lost to fellow Chinese player Liu Song 2–5.

A victory over Munraj Pal in the 2008 World Championship qualifiers set up a match with David Roe, which he lost 5–10.

Xiao  won the Paul Hunter English Open in 2008.

In the 2009 China Open, he beat Michael Holt 5–3 in the wild-card round, progressing to the first round proper where he beat fellow Chinese player Ding Junhui 5–3. He gave three-time world champion Ronnie O'Sullivan a tough game in the next round as O'Sullivan began the match with two successive centuries before Xiao rallied to trail just 4–3, but lost the next frame to bow out of the tournament.

On 10 July 2009, on the World Snooker website, Xiao was voted in the Top 5 players to watch out for in the 2009–10 season.

2011/2012 season
Xiao had a good season in the Players Tour Championship series of tournaments in the 2011–12 season. He reached the quarter-finals of Event 1 and Event 6 and went one better in Event 2, where he was knocked out in the last 4 against compatriot Ding Junhui. The results ensured he reached the 2012 Finals by finishing eighteenth in the Order of Merit. He played in the Finals against the advice of doctors as he had broken a bone in his hand three weeks earlier whilst sleeping on it awkwardly, but despite this beat Dominic Dale 4–2 in the first round of the event. Xiao then pulled off the result of his career to date by defeating recent UK champion, Judd Trump 4–2 to advance to his first ever ranking event quarter-final, where he was beaten by Andrew Higginson 1–4.

Xiao could not qualify for any of the other ranking events during the season, coming closest in the UK Championship, where he lost to Tom Ford in the final qualifying round. He finished the season ranked world number 41, meaning he had risen 23 places during the year.

2012/2013 season

Xiao qualified for the Australian Goldfields Open and the German Masters during the 2012–13 season, losing in the first round in both to Barry Hawkins and Kurt Maflin respectively. He took advantage of the new Asian Players Tour Championship events by taking part in all three of them. He had his best result in the second event by defeating the likes of Marco Fu and Barry Hawkins to reach the semi-finals, where he lost 2–4 to Stephen Lee. His performances helped him to eighth on the Asian PTC Order of Merit, high enough to qualify for the Finals. There, Xiao reached the quarter-finals for the second successive year with wins over Graeme Dott and Alfie Burden, before losing 1–4 to Neil Robertson. Xiao's season came to an end when he lost 4–10 to Jimmy White in the third round of World Championship Qualifying, but he finished the year ranked world number 37, at the time his highest position.

2013/2014 season
In his opening match of the season, Xiao defeated Andrew Norman 5–3 to qualify for the 2013 Wuxi Classic in China where he beat Peter Ebdon 5–3 in the first round and Li Hang 5–4 in the second. He then faced John Higgins in the last 16 and was whitewashed 0–5. Xiao could also not pick up a frame in the first round of the Australian Goldfields Open, as he lost 0–5 to Joe Perry. He won three matches to qualify for the Shanghai Masters and once there defeated Yuan Siyun 5–0 in the wildcard round. Xiao took advantage of a poor performance by Stephen Maguire in the first round to beat him 5–2 and then saw off Peter Lines 5–3. He continued his run to make the semi-finals of a ranking event for the first time as he came back from 4–2 down to beat Mark Davis 5–4 citing afterwards his work with Terry Griffiths as being a key factor in his success. In the semis he played Michael Holt who was also making his ranking event semi-final debut and from 3–3 Xiao made a break of 111, added the next frame and then closed the match out 6–3 with a 127 break. He played Ding Junhui in a first all-Chinese ranking final and was beaten 10–6, but the runner-up's cheque of £35,500 is the highest of his career to date and he also broke into the world's top 32 for the first time.

His second quarter-final appearance of the season came at the German Masters but he lost 5–2 to Ryan Day. Xiao's rise up the world rankings meant he only needed to win one match to reach the World Championship and he did so in emphatic fashion by thrashing Li Yan 10–1. In Xiao's debut in the event he rallied from 4–1 down against Ali Carter to end the first session 5–4 behind, but went on to lose 10–8. Xiao's rise up the rankings continued as he ended the campaign as the world number 23, an increase of 14 spots from the start of the season.

2014/2015 season

At the Australian Goldfields Open, Xiao recorded wins over Liam Highfield, Peter Ebdon and Matthew Stevens to reach the semi-finals of a ranking event for the second time, where Judd Trump defeated him 6–3. He beat Eden Sharav and Noppon Saengkham at the International Championship, but lost 6–4 to Robert Milkins in the third round and was knocked out by the same scoreline in the second round of the UK Championship against Matthew Selt. After edging Highfield 5–4 in the first round of the German Masters, Xiao was thrashed 5–0 by Neil Robertson. Xiao won five matches at the Shoot-Out, the tournament where every match is decided by one ten-minute frame, to reach the final. Xiao lost the lead with just six seconds remaining against Michael White. He progressed through to the final qualifying round of the World Championship and his match against Jimmy Robertson went into a deciding frame which Robertson won on the final pink.

2015/2016 season
After having a high enough ranking to gain automatic entry into the Australian Goldfields Open (where he lost 5–3 to Ian Burns in the first round) Xiao's ranking steadily declined during the season as he could not get beyond the last 48 of any ranking event. He dropped 30 places to end it 51st in the world.

2016/2017 season

At the Riga Masters, Xiao beat Gareth Allen 4–0 and Jamie Jones and David Gilbert both 4–2 to reach his first ranking event quarter-final in two years. He lost 4–2 to Darren Morgan. Xiao defeated Michael Holt 4–1, Noppon Saengkham 4–0 and Neil Robertson 4–3 at the English Open, before being eliminated 4–3 by Chris Wakelin in the fourth round. During his second round match with Shaun Murphy at the Scottish Open, Xiao made a 132 break, the 100th century of his career and went on to win 4–1. He lost by a reversal of this scoreline to Mark Davis in the subsequent round. This was the first year that the Shoot-Out, the tournament where every match is settled by a 10-minute frame played under a shot clock, had its status upgraded to a ranking event. In his quarter-final match with David Gilbert, Xiao ran out of time when potting a yellow but the foul was not picked up by the referee. He won the match and reached the final of the event for the second time and lost by 67–19 points to Anthony McGill. Three comfortable victories saw Xiao qualify for the World Championship and he beat Ryan Day 10–4 in round one, before losing 13–6 to Mark Selby.

2017/2018 season
Xiao reached three quarter-finals, but had victories over John Higgins, Mark Allen and Mark Selby (twice). He qualified for the World Championship, but lost to Ding Junhui 10–3. He finished the season ranked 39.

2018/2019 season
Xiao missed two tournaments in August due to pneumonia. His best results came in the World Open (quarter final) and the World Grand Prix (semi-final). In the World Championship Qualifiers, he was unhappy when his opponent, Michael Judge played on for 20 minutes needing 8 snookers in the 8th frame. The session was duly suspended at 4-4, and Judge ultimately won 10–9. Xiao finished the season ranked 25.

Performance and rankings timeline

Career finals

Ranking finals: 2

Non-ranking finals: 1

Pro-am finals: 3 (3 titles)

Amateur finals: 4 (4 titles)

References

External links

Xiao Guodong at worldsnooker.com
 
 

Chinese snooker players
1989 births
Living people
21st-century Chinese people